Jawahar Navodaya Vidyalaya, Alipurduar or locally called as JNV Barobisha is a boarding, co-educational  school in Alipurduar district of West Bengal in India. Navodaya Vidyalayas are funded by the Indian Ministry of Human Resources Development and administered  by Navodaya Vidyalaya Smiti, an autonomous body under the ministry.

History 
The school was founded in 2005 and is a part of Jawahar Navodaya Vidyalaya schools. This school is administered and monitored by Patna regional office of Navodaya Vidyalaya Smiti. When established, this school was part of Jalpaiguri district. On 25 June 2014 Jalpaiguri district was bifurcated and JNV Barobisha is part of Alipurduar district since then.

Affiliations 
JNV Alipurduar is affiliated to Central Board of Secondary Education with affiliation number 2440007.

See also 

 List of JNV schools

References

External links 

 Official Website of JNV Alipurduar

Boarding schools in West Bengal
High schools and secondary schools in West Bengal
Alipurduar
Schools in Alipurduar district
Educational institutions established in 2005
2005 establishments in West Bengal